The High Accuracy Radial Velocity Planet Searcher (HARPS) is a high-precision echelle planet-finding spectrograph installed in 2002 on the ESO's 3.6m telescope at La Silla Observatory in Chile. The first light was achieved in February 2003. HARPS has discovered over 130 exoplanets to date, with the first one in 2004, making it the most successful planet finder behind the Kepler space observatory. It is a second-generation radial-velocity spectrograph, based on experience with the ELODIE and CORALIE instruments.

Characteristics
The HARPS can attain a precision of 0.97 m/s (3.5 km/h), making it one of only two instruments worldwide with such accuracy. This is due to a design in which the target star and a reference spectrum from a thorium lamp are observed simultaneously using two identical optic fibre feeds, and to careful attention to mechanical stability: the instrument sits in a vacuum vessel which is temperature-controlled to within 0.01 kelvins. The precision and sensitivity of the instrument is such that it incidentally produced the best available measurement of the thorium spectrum. Planet-detection is in some cases limited by the seismic pulsations of the star observed rather than by limitations of the instrument.

The principal investigator on the HARPS is Michel Mayor who, along with Didier Queloz and Stéphane Udry, have used the instrument to characterize the Gliese 581 planetary system, home to one of the smallest known exoplanets orbiting a normal star, and two super-Earths whose orbits lie in the star's habitable zone.

It was initially used for a survey of one-thousand stars.

Since October 2012 the HARPS spectrograph has the precision to detect a new category of planets: habitable super-Earths. This sensitivity was expected from simulations of stellar intrinsic signals, and actual observations of planetary systems. Currently, the HARPS can detect habitable super-Earth only around low-mass stars as these are more affected by gravitational tug from planets and have habitable zones close to the host star.

Discoveries 

This is an incomplete list of exoplanets discovered by the HARPS. The list is sorted by the date of the discovery's announcement. As of December 2017, the list contains 134 exoplanets.

Notes
 (a) — M sin i brown dwarf
 (b) — brown dwarf
 (c) — shorter period

Gallery

See also

Similar instruments:
HARPS-N is a copy of this instrument installed in the northern hemisphere in 2012.
HARPS3 is an updated design of this instrument that will be installed on an upgraded and roboticised Isaac Newton Telescope, in 2024. 
Fiber-optic Improved Next-generation Doppler Search for Exo-Earths, operating at Lick observatory since 2009
Anglo-Australian Planet Search or AAPS is another southern hemisphere planet search program.
ESPRESSO is a new-generation spectrograph for ESO's VLT.
Automated Planet Finder, at the Lick observatory, commissioned in 2013.
CAFE (Calar Alto Fibre-fed Echelle spectrograph) installed on the Calar Alto Observatory's 2.2-metre telescope in 2014, and the CARMENES mounted on the 3.5-metre telescope in 2016.  
EXPRES is a third generation radial velocity spectrograph that is planned to be installed on the Lowell Discovery Telescope.

Space based detectors :
COROT, spacecraft operating since 2007
Kepler, operational since 2009
Terrestrial Planet Finder, not funded, probably cancelled
Space Interferometry Mission, construction halted in 2010
Darwin, early studies for a multi-satellite mission

References

External links 

 (Contains list of discoveries from 2005 survey.)

Astronomical instruments
Telescope instruments
Exoplanet search projects
Spectrographs
European Southern Observatory
Articles containing video clips